Fuhayd ibn Ḥasan ibn Abī Numayy was Emir of Mecca in partnership with his brother Idris ibn Hasan and his nephew Muhsin ibn Husayn from 1603 to 1610.

Fuhayd and Muhsin assumed the Emirate in partnership with Idris in Jumada II 1012 AH (November 1603), by decision of the ashraf. They were included in the du'a alongside Idris, and were together allotted one quarter of the income of the Hejaz due to the Emir of Mecca. Sultan Ahmed I confirmed the appointment of the three sharifs in a decree that was read out in the Masjid al-Haram on Wednesday, 11 Safar 1013 AH (7 July 1604).

In late Rabi II 1019 AH (July 1610), Idris and Muhsin deposed Fuhayd and exiled him from Mecca. After the Hajj season he journeyed to Egypt and then to Istanbul. He met Sultan Ahmed I, and according to some reports the Sultan granted him the Emirate of Mecca. He died in Istanbul in 1020 AH (1611/1612). The year of his death is recorded numerically in the poet's verse:

References

Sources
 
 

 
 

Banu Qatadah
17th-century Arabs